Norsk konversasjonsleksikon Kringla Heimsins is a Norwegian encyclopedia published in six volumes from 1931 to 1934, edited by librarian at Stortinget, Wollert Keilhau. A second edition was issued in eight volumes from 1948 to 1954, edited by Keilhau, Peter Kleppa and Knut Tvedt. It was published by the publishing house Nasjonalforlaget.

References

Norwegian encyclopedias
National encyclopedias
1931 non-fiction books
20th-century encyclopedias
1948 non-fiction books